The 2022 Prime Minister's Resignation Honours are expected to be awarded following the resignation of the Prime Minister, Boris Johnson, in September 2022. This list is different from the Political Honours list announced on 14 October 2022 that had been drawn up and submitted for scrutiny before Johnson's resignation. Another list is under discussion for Liz Truss, who resigned on 25 October 2022.

Pre-announcement speculation 

Speculation about a number of potential peerage recipients has appeared in The Guardian. Its political correspondent wrote on 11 July 2022 that Nadine Dorries, former Secretary of State for Digital, Culture, Media and Sport and MP for Mid Bedfordshire, Paul Dacre, former editor of The Daily Mail, and Allegra Stratton, journalist, former Downing Street Press Secretary, and spouse of James Forsyth, political editor of The Spectator, had been mentioned. Its policy editor wrote on 16 July that Nigel Adams, Minister of State without Portfolio and MP for Selby and Ainsty was also mentioned.

Writing in an opinion piece in The Times, Jon Yeomans speculated that David Ross, a donor to the Conservative Party, might receive an honour.

References 

Boris Johnson
2022 in the United Kingdom
2022 awards in the United Kingdom
2022 in British politics
Prime Minister's Resignation Honours